Cihat Çelik (born 2 January 1996) is a Dutch professional footballer who plays as a winger for Turkish club Kocaelispor.

Club career
Çelik progressed through the youth academy of NEC and made his professional debut for the club on 3 August 2013 as a starter in a 4–1 loss to FC Groningen. He was replaced at half-time by Alireza Jahanbakhsh. On 3 April 2015, he won the second-tier Eerste Divisie with NEC after a 1–0 win over Sparta Rotterdam. Çelik, however, failed to make a definitive breakthrough for the team

Çelik joined Eerste Divisie side FC Oss in summer 2016. In the 2016–17 season, he made 31 appearances for FC Oss in which he scored three goals. In May 2017, Oss announced the option to extend his contract for another year. In July of the same year, Çelik moved to Turkish club Gazişehir Gaziantep, who competed in the second tier TFF First League. In January 2018, he joined Bosnian Premijer Liga side Čelik Zenica on a six-month loan deal. He also failed to establish himself in the Gazişehir Gaziantep starting eleven in the 2018–19 season, and he returned to TOP Oss in July 2019.

Honours
NEC
Eerste Divisie: 2014–15

References

External links
 Voetbal International profile 
 Netherlands profile
 

1996 births
Sportspeople from Oss
Footballers from North Brabant
Dutch people of Turkish descent
Living people
Dutch footballers
Netherlands youth international footballers
Association football wingers
NEC Nijmegen players
TOP Oss players
Gaziantep F.K. footballers
NK Čelik Zenica players
İstanbulspor footballers
Akhisarspor footballers
Kocaelispor footballers
Eredivisie players
Eerste Divisie players
TFF First League players
Premier League of Bosnia and Herzegovina players
TFF Second League players
Dutch expatriate footballers
Expatriate footballers in Turkey
Dutch expatriate sportspeople in Turkey
Expatriate footballers in Bosnia and Herzegovina
Dutch expatriate sportspeople in Bosnia and Herzegovina